Sons and Other Flammable Objects (2007) is a novel by the Iranian-American novelist Porochista Khakpour. It is published by New York Grove.

The book depicts the struggles of an Iranian family to make sense of their new lives in the United States following their emigration from Iran. The history of the nation is embedded in the personal history of the characters, similar to The Blind Owl by Sadegh Hedayat.

The novel won the 77th California Book Award for First Fiction. It was also a New York Times Editor's Choice and included on the Chicago Tribune'''s 2007 "Fall's Best" list. It was also shortlisted for the William Saroyan International Prize for Writing, and long-listed for the 2008 Dylan Thomas Prize.

 Reviews 
According to Kirkus Reviews, the characters are "caught between incompatible worlds, one past and romanticized, the other present but inaccessible." The New York Times praised the novel for its "punchy conversation, vivid detail, sharp humor." Grove Atlantic favorably compared it to Zadie Smith's White Teeth'' for its "rolling storytelling cadences and wry wit".

References

External links

2007 American novels